Pierson Building Center, a locally-owned and operated home improvement center in Eureka, California, is home to the World’s Largest Hammer.

The hammer is a replica of a Vaughan claw hammer (No. D020) and stands 26 feet tall (30 feet overall including the concrete foundation). The octagon-shaped handle is made of real solid wood and is reinforced with a metal I-beam. The hammer's head was fabricated from 18-gauge brushed stainless steel and measures 10 feet, 3 inches in length. All dimensions of the replica are in exact proportion to the original Vaughan hammer.

The hammer was permanently mounted in front of the business on November 12, 1991. It serves as the store's symbol as well as its sign post. Store specials and information are posted on the 12 foot by 7 foot backlit sign that is built into the hammer.

The Big Hammer briefly became a character in the nationally syndicated comic strip  Zippy the Pinhead by Bill Griffith.  The character appeared in two strips in August, 2001.

See also 
 List of world's largest roadside attractions
 Roadside attraction

References

External links
 Hammer types images and descriptions.
 The Hammer Museum
 World's Largest Roadside Attractions
 Pierson Building Center

Buildings and structures in Eureka, California
Companies based in Humboldt County, California
1991 establishments in California
Novelty architecture
Individual signs in the United States
Hammers